is a 1989 2D beat 'em up arcade game developed by Sunsoft and Sega. It was published by Sega in Japan and by Sunsoft of America in North America.

Gameplay
Up to two players control two men who look like officer workers, and proceed through warehouses and urban areas beating up gang members, but the characters are not named and the game has no storyline. Tough Turf'''s control configuration is composed of two attack buttons (punch and kick), as well a jump button to fight against enemies or overcome obstacles. The player has access to a repertoire of techniques by pushing these buttons individually or in combination. Weapons are also along the lines of long iron pipes, knives and broken bottles.

Reception
According to Kurt Katala of Hardcore Gaming 101, "considering there was very little variation amongst the Final Fight and Teenage Mutant Ninja Turtles clones that popped up in the early 90s, [Tough Turf] is interesting to play a game that requires a different approach, and it really is a fresh alternative to Double Dragon''."

References

External links

Tough Turf at Gaming History

1989 video games
Arcade video games
Arcade-only video games
Cooperative video games
Multiplayer and single-player video games
Sega arcade games
Sega beat 'em ups
Sunsoft games
Video games developed in Japan
Video games set in the United States